Hells Angels is a Japanese manga series written and illustrated by Sin'Ichi Hiromoto. It was serialized in Shueisha's Ultra Jump from August 2002 to April 2004 and compiled into three tankōbon volumes. It follows a teenage girl named Rinne Amagane who dies on her way to school and ends up in another school, in the underworld. While down there, she learns to get along with her new classmates, who are all demons.

Hells Angels was adapted into an anime film produced by Madhouse, which premiered at the 2008 Tokyo International Film Festival. The film was initially released under its original title, but later retitled to Hells on the 2012 Blu-ray release. The film was licensed by Discotek Media in 2017.

Plot
Amagane Rinne is a playful and cheerful teenager. One day, she gets hit by a truck on her way to school, and lands in Hell. Far from being discouraged, she wants to finish her schooling and will try despite the circumstances to make friends, which she had promised herself when she was alive. But what she doesn't know is the fact that she is dead.

Cast

Media

Manga
Hells Angels is written and illustrated by Sin'Ichi Hiromoto. It was serialized in Shueisha's Ultra Jump from August 19, 2002, to April 19, 2004. Shueisha collected its chapters in three tankōbon volumes published from April 18, 2003, to July 16, 2004.

Volumes

Film
An anime film adaptation by Madhouse, which premiered at the 2008 Tokyo International Film Festival. The theme song is "Breathe Again feat. Sphere" by Jamosa.

The Japanese distributor TC Entertainment released the film simply titled as Hells on Blu-ray with English subtitles on August 3, 2012. On June 12, 2017, Discotek Media had announced at their panel at AnimeNEXT that they would be releasing Hells on Blu-ray and DVD. On August 13, 2017, Discotek announced that the home media release would include an English dub. The English dub of the film marked the first time voice acting/video production company TeamFourStar (known for the comedic webseries Dragon Ball Z Abridged) worked on an official dub. Discotek released the Blu-ray on November 27, 2018.

Reception
The Hells anime film was one of the Jury Recommended Works at the 12th Japan Media Arts Festival in 2008.

Notes

References

External links
Official anime site 

2000s comedy horror films
2002 manga
2008 anime films
2008 comedy films
2008 films
2008 horror films
Animated films based on manga
Dark comedy anime and manga
Dark fantasy anime and manga
Discotek Media
Japanese comedy films
Japanese horror films
2000s Japanese-language films
Madhouse (company)
Seinen manga
Shueisha franchises
Shueisha manga